Thomas Tomkis (or Tomkys) (c. 1580 – 1634) was an English playwright of the late Elizabethan and the Jacobean eras, and arguably one of the more cryptic figures of English Renaissance drama.

Tomkis was the son of a Staffordshire clergyman, John Tomkys, who became the Public Preacher at St Mary's church, Shrewsbury in Shropshire, from 1582 until his death in 1592. Thomas matriculated in Trinity College, Cambridge in 1597. Tomkis earned his Bachelor of Arts degree in 1600, and his Master of Arts degree in 1604; he became a minor fellow of Trinity College in 1602, and a major fellow in 1604. He remained at the college until 1610, when he moved to Wolverhampton and set up a successful legal practice. His college called him back five years later, to prepare an entertainment of King James I.

Tomkis is credited with two academic plays of the early seventeenth century: Lingua (published 1607) and Albumazar (published 1615). He is also regarded as a likely author of Pathomachia (published 1630). Tomkis represented an important break in the academic drama of the two universities: he wrote in English rather than the traditional Latin. The accessibility of his works facilitated their popularity: Lingua was printed in six editions between 1607 and 1657, while Albumazar went through five editions between 1615 and 1668. More speculatively, Tomkis has been suggested as the possible author of two entertainments, Ruff, Cuff, and Band and Work for Cutlers (both published 1615), and the academic morality play Locus, Corpus, Motus (c. 1604/5).

The nineteenth-century critic F. G. Fleay attempted to link Tomkis with the Tomkins family of prominent musicians in his era, Thomas Tomkins and his son John Tomkins. Fleay's argument is recognized as speculative and incorrect.

References

English dramatists and playwrights
1634 deaths
writers from Wolverhampton
Year of birth uncertain
Fellows of Trinity College, Cambridge
English male dramatists and playwrights